Aventinus was a son of Hercules and the priestess Rhea mentioned in Virgil's Aeneid, Book vii. 656, as an ally of Mezentius and enemy of Aeneas (Dryden's translation):

Servius on this passage speaks of an Aventinus, a king of the aboriginal inhabitants of Rome, who was killed and buried on the hill afterwards called the Aventine Hill. This king may be conflated with the Aeneid figure or with Aventinus:

"The Aventine is a hill in the city of Rome.  It is accepted that it derives its name from birds (aves) which, rising from the Tiber, nested there (as we read in the eighth book of a suitable home for the nests of ill-omened birds).  This is because of a king of the Aboriginal Italians, Aventinus by name, who was both killed and buried there - just as the Alban king Aventinus was, he who was succeeded by Procas.  Varro, however, states that amongst the Roman people, the Sabines accepted this mountain when it was offered them by Romulus, and called it the Aventine after the Aventus river in its area.  It is therefore accepted that these different opinions came later, for in the beginning it was called Aventinus after either the birds or the Aboriginal King: from which it is accepted that the son of Hercules mentioned here took his name from that of the hill, not vice versa."

This Aventinus (the son of Hercules) is not mentioned elsewhere in classical literature.

Sources
Smith's biographical dictionary

References

Characters in the Aeneid
Children of Heracles